SSCV Sleipnir is a semi-submersible crane vessel (SSCV) owned and operated by Heerema Marine Contractors. It is named for Sleipnir, the eight-legged horse ridden by Odin in Norse mythology. It was ordered in 2015 and built in Singapore by Sembcorp Marine. After its completion in 2019, SSCV Sleipnir succeeded Heerema's earlier  as the largest crane vessel in the world.

Design
The vessel is essentially a large platform supported by eight columns (four on each side), with one pontoon per side. Typical SSCVs use larger columns under the cranes to provide support, which can lead to severe pitching in rough seas; SSCV Sleipnir uses columns that are symmetrical fore and aft for calmer motions under higher sea states. The columns are rounded to reduce wave interactions, and the pontoons are streamlined to reduce drag.

The ship's ballast tanks and LNG storage are contained within the eight columns.

Cranes

Conventional tub-mounted cranes ride on bogies or wheels, while the Huisman 10,000t cranes use the bearing directly. Prior to the cranes for Sleipnir, the largest bearings Huisman had used for tub-mounted cranes were only  in diameter.

Each luffing frame weighs , and each boom weighs . The large port and starboard cranes were fabricated at Huisman's factory in Xiamen, China, and shipped in pieces to Singapore; the BigRoll RoRo ships Baffin (now BigLift Baffin) and Beaufort were used to ferry the crane houses, luffing frames, winch frames and booms along with other large pieces in 2018.

The main hoists were tested to 110% of rated load using the modified barge H-408 during sea trials in June 2019.

The main cranes are also equipped with a third (whip) hoist.

Sleipnir is equipped with a third, auxiliary, crane at the opposite end of the ship, near the berths. Huisman provided the auxiliary crane as well.

Power
Power for the ship is provided by 12 MAN 8L51/60DF inline eight-cylinder four-stroke engines equipped with selective catalytic reduction (SCR) to achieve IMO Tier III emissions. "DF" denotes dual-fuel, which means the engines can operate on either low-sulfur Marine Gas Oil (MGO) or liquefied natural gas (LNG). They are grouped into four engine rooms, with three engines per room.

Heerema intends to use primarily LNG fuel, except where terminals lack the infrastructure to provide LNG bunkers. SCR will be used with MGO to reduce  emissions.

Propulsion
The ship is propelled by a total of eight Wärtsilä azimuth thrusters, arranged with four at the forward end and four at the stern; each thruster has an output of 5.5 MW. The four forward thrusters are retractable, designated WST-65RU; aft thrusters are designated WST-65U and are not retractable. All eight thrusters are underwater mountable, meaning the ship does not need to be drydocked to replace a thruster unit.

For SSCV Sleipnir, the forward thrusters are retractable to increase overall efficiency and protect them from damage in shallow waters; a rack-and-pinion system is used to retract the thrusters with a cycle time of 10 minutes. The WST-65U has a propeller  in diameter driven by a propeller shaft tilted at 8° from horizontal to reduce the interaction with the hull and associated hydrodynamic losses.

The cruise speed is achieved using only the aft thrusters.

Stationkeeping
The dynamic positioning system was able to hold the ship's position to within a  area during simulated operations for sea trials.

Accommodations
The berthing area is designed to accommodate 400 people in 5 executive, 45 single, and 175 double cabins. The dining hall can hold 200 people.

SSCV Sleipnir is equipped with nine Harding FF1200 freefall lifeboat systems, including davits; each lifeboat has a capacity of 70.

History

Although the concept of a crane vessel larger than SSCV Thialf was studied as early as 2008, market conditions precluded formal design work until 2011. Heerema developed the concept internally from 2011 to 2012, determining the optimum vessel type and capabilities.

GVA Consultants completed preliminary conceptual studies for a new crane vessel for Heerema in March 2013, and were awarded a basic design contract in February 2014. One month later, in March 2014, Heerema signed a letter of intent with Huisman to supply the world's largest offshore cranes; the cranes were to be equipped on the new crane vessel, designated NSCV, for New Semi-submersible Crane Vessel, in lieu of a name. 

In March 2015, Heerema Offshore Services B.V. signed a letter of intent with Jurong Shipyard Pte Ltd to build NSCV in Singapore; Jurong's parent Sembcorp Marine announced the contract, worth US$1 billion, had been awarded on July 15, 2015. The drydock construction was a unique factor in Sembcorp's favor when Heerema was evaluating bids for construction. The first steel was cut for the cranes, which were being built in China, in July 2015. Heerema announced the NSCV would be named Sleipnir, for Odin's eight-legged horse, on December 18, 2015.

The two main port and starboard cranes were installed by August 2018. The vessel was christened SSCV Sleipnir by Mrs. Maha Hatfield on May 24, 2019, and embarked on sea trials and crane load tests afterwards. Sea trials were completed in late June 2019.

Operations
Heerema booked its first contracts for SSCV Sleipnir in 2017, two years before it was completed. During the ship's maiden voyage from Singapore to Spain via the Cape of Good Hope, it set a world record for the largest LNG bunkering operation on July 10, when  of LNG were transferred to it off the coast of Sumatra from Coral Fraseri, chartered by Titan LNG from Anthony Veder. Coral Fraseri was scheduled to refuel Sleipnir in Spain, prior to it passing into the Mediterranean Sea.

Sleipnir is next contracted to install the production and living quarters platforms of the Tyra Future project for Maersk Oil. The existing Tyra platforms will be picked by Sleipnir and loaded on barges for recycling. Other future contracts include Brae Bravo (jacket and topsides removal) and Hollandse Kust Zuid Alpha (HVAC platform installation).

References

External links
 Heerema's Sleipnir page
 Actual position, status, weather and other updates from SSCV Sleipnir
 
 

Ships built in Singapore
Ships of the Netherlands
Crane vessels
Semi-submersibles
2019 ships